Luksang Tagumpay is a 1956 Filipino drama film by Gregorio Fernandez starring Jaime de la Rosa, Delia Razon and Rudy Fernandez. The movie won Best Picture in FAMAS Awards 1957. First screen appearance of the young Rudy Fernandez. Director Gregorio Fernandez hired his then three-year-old son to appear in the film.

Plot
After years of waiting for the absent husband who had been reported missing in the Korean front, Anita (Delia Razon) finally resigns to early widowhood and accepts the insistent pleas of a kind, loving and handsome Dr. Ricardo Llamas (Jaime de la Rosa). Marriage brings them happiness but fate has other plans for them.

External links

Philippine drama films
Tagalog-language films
1956 films
Films directed by Gregorio Fernandez
1956 drama films
Philippine black-and-white films